The 2021 Shepherd Rams football team represented Shepherd University during the 2021 NCAA Division II football season. The 2021 season was the second for the Rams as a member of the Pennsylvania State Athletic Conference after joining the conference in 2019. Due to the COVID-19 pandemic, the 2020 season was canceled. The team was led by 4th year head coach Ernie McCook, and played their home games at Ram Stadium in Shepherdstown, WV.

On December 17, Junior QB Tyson Bagent won the Harlon Hill Trophy, as most valuable player in NCAA Division II for the 2021 season.

Playoffs
Shepherd advanced to the NCAA Division II Football Championship as the #2 seed in Super Region 1. In the first round, they hosted Findlay, winning 3831.

In the second round against Notre Dame (OH), the Rams won 3834, on a Tyson Bagent 23 yard touchdown pass with two seconds remaining.

In the quarterfinal round against Kutztown, Bagent threw a 42 yard touchdown pass as time expired, resulting in a 3028 win for Shepherd.

Shepherd went on to lose in the semi-finals, 755, against Ferris State.

Schedule

Rankings

References

Shepherd
Shepherd Rams football seasons
Shepherd Rams football